Marin Lovrović may refer to:

Marin Lovrović, Jr. (born 1973), Croatian Olympic sailor
Marin Lovrović, Sr., Croatian sailor, father of Marin Lovrović, Jr.